The Ashanti Regional Minister is the Ghana government official who is responsible for overseeing the administration of the Ashanti Region of Ghana. The region is home to the Ashanti people who are ruled by the Asantehene. It has always been a politically important region due to this. Since the December 2019 referendum, there are currently sixteen administrative regions in Ghana. The capital has always been at Kumasi.

List of Ashanti Regional Ministers

See also

Ministers of the Ghanaian Government
Ashanti Region

Notes

Politics of Ghana
Ashanti Regional Minister